Homaloptera bilineata is a species of ray-finned fish in the genus Homaloptera found in Myanmar and Thailand.

References

Fish of Thailand
Homaloptera
Fish described in 1860
Taxa named by Edward Blyth